Events in the year 1857 in Brazil.

Incumbents
Monarch – Pedro II.
Prime Minister – Marquis of Caxias (until 4 May), Marquis of Olinda (starting 4 May).

Events

Births

Deaths

References

 
1850s in Brazil
 
Years of the 19th century in Brazil
Brazil
Brazil